Jixiang station, is a station of Line 3, Shenzhen Metro. The station opened on 28 December 2010. It is located in the south of Ailian village. There are 5 ticket vendors in Jixiang Station.

Station layout

Exits

References

External links
 Shenzhen Metro Lixiang Station (Chinese)
 Shenzhen Metro Lixiang Station (English)

Railway stations in Guangdong
Shenzhen Metro stations
Longgang District, Shenzhen
Railway stations in China opened in 2010